The flavescent warbler (Myiothlypis flaveola) is a species of bird in the family Parulidae. Its name comes from flavescent, a yellowish colour.  It is found in Argentina, Bolivia, Brazil, Colombia, Guyana, Paraguay, and Venezuela.  Its natural habitats are subtropical or tropical dry forest and subtropical or tropical moist lowland forest.

References

flavescent warbler
Birds of the Colombian Andes
Birds of the Venezuelan Coastal Range
Birds of Brazil
Birds of Bolivia
Birds of Paraguay
flavescent warbler
flavescent warbler
Taxonomy articles created by Polbot